Thomas Monsell (1763–1846) was an Anglican priest in the 19th century. 

Monsell was born in Limerick and educated at Trinity College, Dublin. He was Archdeacon of Derry  from 1820 until his death in November 1846. He was also Prebendary of St Michael's at Christ Church Cathedral, Dublin from 1829 until 1837; and Precentor of Christ Church from 1837 until his death.

His son was the hymnist The Rev. John Samuel Bewley Monsell and his daughter the botanical artist Diana Conyngham Ellis.

References

1846 deaths
1763 births
Archdeacons of Derry
Alumni of Trinity College Dublin
Clergy from Limerick (city)
18th-century Irish Anglican priests
19th-century Irish Anglican priests